The United Kingdom Electronic Travel Authorisation (ETA) is a planned Home Office electronic system that will be used to pre-check people travelling to the UK.

The system, as part of the Nationality and Borders Bill, will operate using an online application which is checked against a variety of security databases, and if the person has not committed a crime they will be given travel authorisation. If the person has committed a crime, their application will go for further review to decide whether or not to allow them travel authorisation.

Areas that will require a UK Electronic Travel Authorisation 

All the visa free countries except Ireland. Irish citizens do not need leave to enter the United Kingdom.

Exception for Northern Ireland 
Those Legally Resident in the Republic of Ireland who would not normally need a UK Visa would be exempt from having to apply for an Electronic Travel Authorisation if they are arriving in Northern Ireland from within the Common Travel Area.

See also
Visa policy of the United Kingdom
ETIAS (Electronic Travel Authorization for Schengen Area)
Travel visa
Australian Electronic Travel Authority
United States Electronic Travel Authorization
Canadian Electronic Travel Authorization 
New Zealand Electronic Travel Authority

References

External links 
 
 

Human migration
International travel documents
Consular affairs
Immigration
Visa policy of the United Kingdom